Ajesaia is a Malagasy football club based in Antananarivo, Madagascar. The team won the Coupe de Madagascar in 2006, qualifying them for the Super Coupe de Madagascar (which they lost 1–0 to AS Adema) and the CAF Confederation Cup (where they beat Curepipe Starlight SC of Mauritius in the first round, but lost to Ismaily SC of Egypt in the second).

The team has a feeder club agreement with SS Saint-Pauloise of Réunion, which in turn has one with French giants Olympique Lyonnais.

Achievements
THB Champions League: 2
2007, 2009

Coupe de Madagascar: 1
2006

Super Coupe de Madagascar: 2
2007, 2009

Mondial Pupilles de Plomelin (Under 13s): 1
2005

Performance in CAF competitions
CAF Champions League: 1 appearance
2010 – Preliminary Round

CAF Confederation Cup: 1 appearance
2007 – First Round

External links
Doula, Ajesaia's rising star

Football clubs in Madagascar
Antananarivo
1998 establishments in Madagascar
Association football clubs established in 1998